Loves is a 2004 Indian Tamil-language romantic drama film directed by K. Jayapandian starring Thamizh, Sona and Sweety. The film was released on 30 July 2004.

Cast 
Thamizh as Hari
Sona as Mala
Sweety as Amala
Deva as Amala's brother
Junior Silk as a lecturer
Vadivelu
Chaplin Balu
Vijay Babu
Shakeela as herself (guest appearance)

Production 
The film marked the debut of Vikram, a dentist by profession, who appeared under the stage name of Thamizh. Sona, the sister of actress Rajashree, also made her debut in Tamil cinema through the film. She had previously been attached to star in Sonnal Thaan Kaadhala (2001), under the stage name of Bobby, but was later removed from the project by director T. Rajender.

Reception 
Malini Mannath of Chennai Online wrote that "it's a time affair, with mediocre scripting and treatment" and that the "ending is thoughtless and insensitive too". She also compared the film's story to that of Punnagai Poove (2003).

A reviewer from entertainment portal BizHat.com noted "Loves is nothing but an old wine in a new bottle. It's a love triangle that directors and producers have tested time and again". The critic added "Jayapandian has given an average film with a blend of comedy and emotional story. He has made the screenplay keeping in mind the front benchers".

References 

2004 films
2000s Tamil-language films
Indian romantic comedy films
2004 romantic comedy films